The International Business Center was a proposed supertall skyscraper in Seoul, South Korea. The skyscraper was planned to be , with 130 storeys.

The building was renamed Digital Media City Landmark Building (Seoul Lite) in 2008, and details were changed to promote the plan. Nonetheless, the project was cancelled in 2012.

See also 
Seoul Lite (Digital Media City Landmark Building)

References

Proposed buildings and structures in South Korea
Skyscrapers in Seoul